Hindrek is an Estonian masculine given name. It is a cognate of the foreign names Heinrich, Henry and Henri. Hendrik and Indrek are common Estonian variants of the name Hindrek. 

As of 1 January 2020, 160 men in Estonia have the first name Hindrek, making it the 501st most popular male name in the country. People bearing the names Hindrek include:

Hindrek Kesler (born 1958), architect
Hindrek Meri (1934–2009), statesman
Hindrek Ojamaa (born 1995), footballer 
Hindrek Older (born 1938), agronomist
Hindrek Pulk (born 1990), volleyball player

References

Estonian masculine given names